The Genesian Theatre is an amateur theatre company based in Sydney, Australia, named in honour of Saint Genesius, patron saint of actors. Formed in 1944 by members of the Sydney Catholic Youth Organisation, it has since evolved into a community theatre in the heart of the Sydney central business district.

Description and history
The Genesian Theatre has been operating from historic St John The Evangelist Church in Kent Street  since January 1954. St John's Church dates from 1868. It has served as both a church and a poor school until 1932 when it became the Kursaal Theatre, housing the Sydney Repertory Company. In 1938 it became the first Matthew Talbot Hostel.

Alumni of the theatre include John Bell, Bryan Brown, Baz Luhrmann, Coral Lansbury, Judi Farr, Nick Enright, Angela Punch Peter Carroll.

Membership is open to any members of the community that are over the age of 18. Members are invited to participate in all aspects of theatre production, including acting, designing, back-stage work, directing and administration.

The Genesian Theatre produces six main stage productions each year as well as running classes, workshops, and many other activities.

In September 2017, the Catholic Church advised Genesian that they had sold the building to a developer for over $6 million and that the theatre company would be required to vacate by November 2018. The company later negotiated with the new owner of the building to remain at Kent st until 2020. The company announced a further year at Kent st in October 2019, with a likely move from the building to a new venue in 2021.  The church is heritage listed.

The company will reopen at a hall at St Joseph's Church, Rozelle following renovations and when COVID-19 restrictions permit.

References

External links
 Official website
 

Amateur theatre companies in Australia
Theatres in Sydney
Theatre in Sydney